The Kingdom of Zimbabwe (c. 1220–1450) was a medieval Shona (Karanga) kingdom located in modern-day Zimbabwe. Its capital, today's Masvingo (meaning fortified), which is commonly called Great Zimbabwe, is the largest stone structure in precolonial Southern Africa. This kingdom came about after the collapse of the Kingdom of Mapungubwe.

Name 

The name "Zimbabwe" stems from a Shona term for Great Zimbabwe, a medieval city in the country's south-east whose remains are now a protected site. Two different theories address the origin of the word. Many sources hold that "Zimbabwe" derives from dzimba-dza-mabwe, translated from the Karanga dialect of Shona as "houses of stones" (dzimba = plural of imba, "house"; mabwe = plural of bwe, "stone"). The Kalanga-speaking Shona people live around Great Zimbabwe in the modern-day province of Masvingo. Archaeologist Peter Garlake claims that "Zimbabwe" represents a contracted form of dzimba-hwe, which means "venerated houses" in the Zezuru dialect of Shona and usually references chiefs' houses or graves.

History

Rise of Mutapa 
Dating since at least the 15th century, the Mutapa state had once controlled the expanse of territory between the rivers Zambezi, Mazowe, Ruenya, Hunyani and the Umvukwe Range.

In approximately 1430, Prince Nyatsimba Mutota from the Great Zimbabwe travelled north to the Dande region in search of salt. He then defeated the Tonga and Tavara with his army and established his dynasty at Chitakochangonya Hill. The land he conquered would become the Kingdom of Mutapa. Within a generation, Mutapa eclipsed Great Zimbabwe as the economic and political power in Zimbabwe. By 1450, the capital and most of the kingdom had been abandoned.

D.N. Beach in 2014 argued that "Because of the reluctance or inability of many researchers to work in Rhodesia and Mozambique in the last 15 years, the history of the Mutapa state has been heavily dependent upon the work of D.P. Abraham, at least as far as traditions are concerned."

Aftermath 
The end of the kingdom resulted in a fragmenting of proto-Shona power. Two bases emerged along a north–south axis. In the north, the Kingdom of Mutapa carried on and even improved upon Zimbabwe's administrative structure. It did not carry on the stone-masonry tradition to the extent of its predecessor. In the south, the Kingdom of Butua was established as a smaller, but nearly identical, version of Zimbabwe. Both states were eventually absorbed into the largest and most powerful of the Shona states, the Rozwi Empire.

Government 

The social institution had a Mambo as its leader, along with an increasingly rigid three-tiered class structure. The kingdom taxed other rulers throughout the region. The kingdom was composed of over 150 tributaries headquartered in their own minor zimbabwes. They established rule over a wider area than the Mapungubwe, the Butua or the Mutapa.

Economy and culture 
The Kingdom of Zimbabwe controlled the ivory and gold trade from the interior to the southeastern coast of Africa. Asian and Arabic goods could be found in abundance in the kingdom's region. Economic domestication, which had been crucial to the earlier proto-Shona states, was also practiced. The Great Zimbabwe people mined minerals like gold, copper and iron. Cattle was important to the elites in the kingdom since their wealth came from the management of cattle.

The rulers of Zimbabwe (called Mambo) brought artistic and stonemasonry traditions from Mapungubwe. The construction of elaborate stone buildings and walls reached its apex in the kingdom.

See also
Kingdom of Butua
Kingdom of Mutapa
Khami
Danangombe

References

Sources

Further reading 

 Cartwright, M. (14 March 2019). Great Zimbabwe. World History Encyclopedia

History of Zimbabwe
African civilizations
Former kingdoms